Ubaldo Soddu (23 July 1883 – 25 July 1949) was an Italian military officer, who commanded the Italian Forces in the Greco-Italian War for a month.

Soddu was born in Salerno. From 1939 to 1940, Soddu was under-secretary at the Ministry of War. In November 1940 he was sent to Albania to take over command of the Italian Forces from General Sebastiano Visconti Prasca and then sacked and replaced by the Chief of the General staff Ugo Cavallero four weeks later.

1883 births
1949 deaths
People from Salerno
Italian generals
Italian military personnel of World War II
Greco-Italian War